Olliver's Adventures is a Canadian animated television series that originally aired on Teletoon on September 3, 2002 with the first 13 episodes. It was produced in Flash by Collideascope Digital and Decode Entertainment and consists of 117 shorts or 39 episodes of 3 shorts each, along with a pilot special.

Plot
The show is about a young boy named Olliver (Ollie) who invents a world of his own using his imagination, creating stories that reconfigure his everyday life and impressions of the world into epic adventures.

Characters
Ollie (voiced by Joanne Miller) usually has his toys as his companions:
 Jorge the iguana (voiced by Glenn Lefchak)
 Trog the strong caveman
 Tara the woman (voiced by Tara Doyle)
 Zoomerax the alien
 Beano the dog
 The Giant Big Sisters are a trio of bully siblings
 Mom and Dad are parents

Episodes

Pilot special
The pilot special, written by Edward Kay and directed by Sean Scott, was named Ollie's Under-the-Bed Adventures and won a Gemini Award for Best Animated Program. It consists of 10 two-minute shorts, and premiered on Teletoon on April 15, 2001.

Season 1 (2002)

Season 2 (2003)

Season 3 (2005)

Production
The pilot special cost about $500,000 (US$330,000) to produce, and was originally distributed by Cochran Entertainment.

Telecast and home media
Olliver's Adventures originally aired on Teletoon on September 3, 2002 with the first 13 episodes. It consisted 117 shorts or 39 episodes of 3 shorts each, along with a pilot special. The final episode aired on March 20, 2005. In the USA, the show aired on Animania HD.

Season 1 is available on Tubi. The first 6 episodes (18 shorts) have also been released on Ameba TV.

Awards and nominations

References

External links
 

2000s Canadian animated television series
2002 Canadian television series debuts
2005 Canadian television series endings
Animated television series about children
Canadian children's animated adventure television series
Canadian children's animated fantasy television series
Canadian flash animated television series
English-language television shows
Sentient toys in fiction
Television series by DHX Media
Television shows set in Nova Scotia
Television shows filmed in Halifax, Nova Scotia
Teletoon original programming